Nada Ševo is a politician in Serbia. She has served in the Assembly of Vojvodina since 2020. Elected as a member of People's Strong Serbia in an alliance with the Democratic Party of Serbia (Demokratska stranka Srbije, DSS), Ševo joined the Serbian Progressive Party's Aleksandar Vučić – For Our Children parliamentary group in October 2020.

Private life and career
Ševo holds a Bachelor of Laws degree. She lives in Novi Sad.

Politician
People's Strong Serbia contested the 2020 Vojvodina provincial election on the DSS's MELTA 2020 list. Ševo appeared in the third position and was elected when the list won five mandates; the other four elected candidates were from DSS. The Progressive Party and its allies won the election, and the DSS/METLA caucus served in opposition.

On 29 October 2020, Ševo left People's Strong Serbia and the DSS/METLA caucus (amid much acrimony) and joined the Progressive-led For Our Children parliamentary group. Her decision caused the DSS/METLA group to lose its parliamentary status, as five members are required for official recognition. Ševo is now the vice-president of the assembly committee on health, social policy, labour, demographic policy, and social child care. It is unclear if she has formally joined the Progressive Party.

References

1978 births
Living people
Politicians from Novi Sad
Serbian women in politics
Members of the Assembly of Vojvodina
People's Strong Serbia politicians